The Province of Bergamo is a province in the Lombardy region of Italy. Its capital is the city of Bergamo.

Geography

The Province of Bergamo borders the province of Sondrio to the north, the province of Brescia to the east, the province of Cremona to the south and the Metropolitan City of Milan and the  provinces of Monza and Brianza and Lecco to the west. Its rivers include the Serio, Dezzo, Cherio, Brembo, and Adda. Its valleys include the Seriana, Cavallina, and Brembana. Other, smaller but important valleys include the Valle Imagna, the Val di Scalve, the Val Brembilla, the Val Serina, and the Val Taleggio. The southern part is mainly made up of flatlands.

In the east, Lake Iseo forms its boundary which the Oglio from the Camonica Valley flows through.  Minerals are found in the area of Trescore Balneario and San Pellegrino (the source of the mineral water of the same name) and other places.

Economy

Agriculture
The low-lying areas are rich in pastures along with corn, wine, grain, rice and flax that are cultivated.  Hunting is common.
Very common is also the breeding of poultry, pigs with modern techniques, and the traditional sheep herding.

Industry
The provincial economy is based on SMEs, and varied products are made. The main heavy industries of the province of Bergamo are mineral processing, especially iron, concrete and marble. There is a large tractor plant, in Treviglio, a lot of global companies have a plant in Bergamo, like Tenaris and ABB in Dalmine. In Curno is placed the headquarter of Brembo which is also seated in Stezzano inside a famous technology area named Kilometro Rosso.
Another international brand present is Alfa Laval in Suisio.

Silks, metallurgical products and clothing are also common products. A Heineken Italia brewery makes Moretti La Rossa in Comun Nuovo.  Bergamo masons and assemblers are very famous for their ability and dedication to work.

Demography
As of the end of 2006, the province of Bergamo hosted 92,000 immigrants from counties outside the European Union (less than 10% of the total population).

About 15,000 of them came from Bolivia, especially the city of Cochabamba, due to the strong relations of the Roman Catholic Diocese of Bergamo and the Archdiocese of Cochabamba. Most of Bolivians reside in the town of Bergamo.

See also
 Communes of the province of Bergamo
 Galleria orobica

References

External links
 Official website

 
Provinces of Italy